The 2000 Maidstone Borough Council election took place on 4 May 2000 to elect members of Maidstone Borough Council in Kent, England. One third of the council was up for election and the council stayed under no overall control.

After the election, the composition of the council was
Liberal Democrat 22
Conservative 16
Labour 12
Independent 5

Campaign
Before the election no party had a majority, with the Liberal Democrats the largest party on the council. Asylum seekers was reported as being a big issue in the election, after a rise in council tax from Kent County Council was partly put down to asylum seekers in the county. The Conservative party said it was boosted in the election by pledges of a "crackdown" made by the national party leader William Hague.

Election result
Overall turnout in the election was 27.1%.

Ward results

References

2000 English local elections
2000
2000s in Kent